Lophophelma is a genus of moths in the family Geometridae described by Prout in 1912.

Species
Lophophelma albapex (Inoue, 1988)
Lophophelma calaurops (Prout, 1912)
Lophophelma costistrigaria (Moore, 1868)
Lophophelma erionoma (Swinhoe, 1893)
Lophophelma erionoma erionoma (Swinhoe, 1893) (=Terpna furvirubens Prout, 1934)
Lophophelma erionoma albicomitata (Prout, 1927)
Lophophelma erionoma kiangsiensis (Chu, 1981)
Lophophelma erionoma subnubigosa (Prout, 1927) (=Terpna erionoma imitaria Sterneck, 1928)
Lophophelma eucryphes (West, 1930)
Lophophelma eupines (West, 1930)
Lophophelma funebrosa (Warren, 1896)
Lophophelma funebrosa funebrosa (Warren, 1896)
Lophophelma funebrosa tenuilinea (Warren, 1899)
Lophophelma iterans (Prout, 1926)
Lophophelma iterans iterans (Prout, 1926)
Lophophelma iterans onerosus (Inoue, 1970)
Lophophelma loncheres (Prout, 1931)
Lophophelma luteipes (Felder & Rogenhofer, 1875)
Lophophelma luteipes luteipes (Felder & Rogenhofer, 1875) (=Pingasa similis Moore, 1888)
Lophophelma luteipes enthusiastes (Prout, 1927)
Lophophelma neonoma (Hampson, 1907)
Lophophelma niveata (Debauche, 1941)
Lophophelma obtecta (Debauche, 1941)
Lophophelma pingbiana (Chu, 1981)
Lophophelma rubroviridata (Warren, 1898)
Lophophelma ruficosta (Hampson, 1891)
Lophophelma taiwana (Wileman, 1912)
Lophophelma varicoloraria (Moore, 1868)
Lophophelma vigens (Butler, 1880)
Lophophelma vigens vigens (Butler, 1880)
Lophophelma vigens ruficoloraria (Warren, 1897)

References

External links

"74.7 Geometrinae アオシャク亜科". Digital Moths of Asia. Archived from the original 15 April 2013.

Pseudoterpnini
Geometridae genera
Taxa named by Louis Beethoven Prout
Moths described in 1912